Rewind is the second rockumentary by Welsh rock band Stereophonics. Released in 2007, it is the band's sixth DVD release. It contains over three hours of live and documentary footage spanning their entire career; from pre-Stereophonics years to their signing to V2 Records in 1996 to 2006. A booklet was also included with the DVD, featuring several previously unseen photographs of the band, from Kelly Jones' own personal photo album.

Release

Rewind - Disc one
Documentary film lasting 100 mins also including extended scenes, a complete set of theatrical trailers for Rewind and a 60-second preview of Stereophonics' then-unreleased album, Pull the Pin.

Live - Disc two
Live performances from 1997–2006, including a never-before-seen acoustic concert from 2001.

Track listing

References

Stereophonics video albums
V2 Records video albums
2007 live albums
2007 video albums
Live video albums
Rockumentaries
2000s English-language films